Arli Chontey (born 1 July 1992) is a Kazakhstani male weightlifter who competes in the -55 kg division. He won the gold medal in the men's 55 kg event at the 2021 World Weightlifting Championships held in Tashkent, Uzbekistan.

Chontey was born in Kyrgyzstan and moved to China at a young age. Not given a chance to get into China's national weightlifting team, he moved back to Kyrgyzstan in 2008. In 2011, Chontey began training with the Kazakh national team in 2011. In 2012, he became a citizen of Kazakhstan.

Competition
He finished sixth overall at the 2013 and 2014  World Championships, and placed second in the snatch in 2015, but failed all attempts in the clean and jerk. He qualified for the 2016 Summer Olympics.

He won the silver medal in the men's 55kg event at the 2022 Asian Weightlifting Championships held in Manama, Bahrain.

He won the silver medal in the men's 55kg Snatch event at the 2022 World Weightlifting Championships held in Bogotá, Colombia.

Major results

References

External links

1992 births
Living people
Olympic weightlifters of Kazakhstan
Weightlifters at the 2016 Summer Olympics
Kazakhstani male weightlifters
Weightlifters at the 2014 Asian Games
Universiade medalists in weightlifting
World Weightlifting Championships medalists
Sportspeople from Almaty
Universiade bronze medalists for Kazakhstan
Asian Games competitors for Kazakhstan
Medalists at the 2017 Summer Universiade
Islamic Solidarity Games competitors for Kazakhstan
Islamic Solidarity Games medalists in weightlifting
21st-century Kazakhstani people